Valdemar Evert Heinström (27 September 1912 – 22 October 2009) was a Finnish long-distance runner. He competed in the men's 10,000 metres at the 1948 Summer Olympics.

References

1912 births
2009 deaths
Athletes (track and field) at the 1948 Summer Olympics
Finnish male long-distance runners
Olympic athletes of Finland
Place of birth missing